Auge is a commune in the Ardennes department in the Grand Est region of north-eastern France.

Geography
Auge is located some 45 km west by north-west of Charleville-Mézières and 22 km east by south-east of Hirson. The western border of the commune is the border between the departments of Ardennes and Aisne. Access to the commune is by the European route E44 (D 8043) from Hirson which passes through the north of the commune and continues east to Maubert-Fontaine. Access to the village is by either the Grande Rue or by the Ruelle de l'Église which both branch south from the E44. Apart from a band of forest on the south-eastern border (The Bois de Moirvaux) and some patches of forest in the south-west the commune is entirely farmland.

Neighbouring communes and villages

Toponymy
The name of the town was written Ogiae in 1112 in a privilege of Pope Paschal II to the Abbey of Saint-Nicaise in Reims and as Oggeium in a bull of Innocent II for the same monastery at Reims.

History
This site has been on an ancient road between Mézières and the North since Classical Antiquity. Gallo-Roman foundations, coins, and pieces of pottery have been found.

Heraldry

Administration

List of Successive Mayors

Demography
In 2017 the commune had 60 inhabitants.

Sites and monuments
The Tombstone of Jacques de Corderand, his wife, and his son (18th century) in the Church of Saint-Gorgery is registered as an historical object.

Notable people linked to the commune

Jean-Michel Devresse, a farmer at Auge, relaunched livestock farming of Ardennes Red Turkeys (Dindon rouge des Ardennes) in 1985, so that this species would not disappear.

See also
Communes of the Ardennes department

References

External links
Auge on Géoportail, National Geographic Institute (IGN) website 
Auge on the 1750 Cassini Map

Communes of Ardennes (department)